The 88th Ohio Infantry Regiment, sometimes 88th Ohio Volunteer Infantry (or 88th OVI) was an infantry regiment in the Union Army during the American Civil War.  It was initially known as the "1st Battalion Governor's Guard".

Service

The 88th Ohio Infantry was organized at Camp Chase in Columbus, Ohio, in July 1862 and mustered in on October 27, 1862, for three years service under Colonel George Washington Neff.

When Edmund Kirby Smith threatened Cincinnati, Ohio, in September 1862, the 88th moved to Covington, Kentucky, but soon returned to Camp Chase.  A detachment then served in western Virginia and Maryland, but returned to Ohio to operate against John Hunt Morgan. The regiment served guard duty at Camp Chase until October 1863, and served at Cincinnati, Ohio, until December 20, 1863. It then returned to Columbus to serve guard duty at Camp Chase until July 1865.

The 88th Ohio mustered out of the service at Camp Chase on July 3, 1865.

Casualties
The regiment lost a total of 80 enlisted men, all due to disease.

Commanders
 Colonel George Washington Neff

Notable members
 Captain Joseph D. Taylor, Company E - U.S. Representative from Ohio, 1883–1885, 1887–1893

See also

 List of Ohio Civil War units
 Ohio in the Civil War

References
 Dyer, Frederick H. A Compendium of the War of the Rebellion (Des Moines, IA:  Dyer Pub. Co.), 1908.
 Ohio Roster Commission. Official Roster of the Soldiers of the State of Ohio in the War on the Rebellion, 1861–1865, Compiled Under the Direction of the Roster Commission (Akron, OH:  Werner Co.), 1886–1895.
 Reid, Whitelaw. Ohio in the War: Her Statesmen, Her Generals, and Soldiers (Cincinnati, OH:  Moore, Wilstach, & Baldwin), 1868. 
Attribution

External links
 Ohio in the Civil War: 88th Ohio Volunteer Infantry by Larry Stevens
 National flag of the 88th Ohio Infantry
 Regimental flag of the 88th Ohio Infantry
 Guidon of the 88th Ohio Infantry
 Guidon of the 88th Ohio Infantry

Military units and formations established in 1862
Military units and formations disestablished in 1865
Units and formations of the Union Army from Ohio
1862 establishments in Ohio